James J. "Sonny" McCullough (born January 11, 1942) is an American Republican Party politician, who served in the New Jersey State Senate from 2007 to 2008, where he represented the 2nd Legislative District.

Biography
Born on January 11, 1942, in Atlantic City, New Jersey, McCullough graduated in 1960 from Atlantic City High School. He attended Rutgers University with a major in public works management, and Rider College majoring in business.

On November 6, 2007, McCullough lost his re-election bid, having been ousted by Democratic Party New Jersey General Assembly member Jim Whelan.

McCullough succeeded Senator William Gormley, who announced in January 2007 that he would not seek reelection to the State Senate.  Gormley had indicated that he will support District 2 Assemblyman Francis J. Blee as his successor, and Gormley stepped down on February 15, 2007.  Despite Gormley's endorsement McCullough defeated Blee for the interim spot.

McCullough served in the Senate on the Labor Committee and the Wagering, Tourism and Historic Preservation Committee.

McCullough has served on the Egg Harbor Township Committee and has been mayor of Egg Harbor Township since 1996, in addition to mayoral stints in 1986 and from 1988 to 1992. He was a member of the township's Planning Board since 1996 (and also in 1986 and from 1988 to 1992). McCullough served as Municipal Utilities Authority Commissioner 2000-06 and on the Zoning Board from 1976 to 1980.

McCullough lives in the Seaview Harbor section of the township. He and his wife Georgene, have four sons, Jim, George, William (Sonny) and Sean, and five grandchildren.

District 2
Each of the forty districts in the New Jersey Legislature has one representative in the New Jersey Senate and two members in the New Jersey General Assembly. The other representatives from the 2nd Legislative District who served with McCullough in the 2006-2008 legislative session were:
Assemblyman Francis J. Blee, and
Assemblyman Jim Whelan

References

External links
Senator James J. 'Sonny' McCullough, Project Vote Smart
New Jersey Legislature financial disclosure form for 2006 (PDF)

1942 births
Living people
Atlantic City High School alumni
Missing middle or first names
Mayors of places in New Jersey
Republican Party New Jersey state senators
People from Egg Harbor Township, New Jersey
Politicians from Atlantic City, New Jersey
Rider University alumni
Rutgers University alumni